Arslanbek Ruslanovich Makhmudov (born 7 June 1989) is a Russian professional boxer who has held the WBC-NABF heavyweight title since 2019.

Early life
Arslanbek was born in the town of Mozdok in North-Ossetia to a Kumyk family. He studied in Russian State University of Physical Education, Sport, Youth and Tourism. In his amateur career he performed for "Dinamo" boxing team based in Moscow, and won European student championship.

Professional career
Makhmudov made his professional debut on 8 December 2017, scoring a first-round technical knockout (TKO) victory over Jaime Barajas at the Danforth Music Hall in Toronto, Canada.

He scored four stoppage wins in 2018, with TKOs over Christian Larrondo in April; Elder Hernandez in May; and Emilio Zarate in October; followed by a knockout (KO) over Andrew Satterfield in November.

Following first-round TKO victories over Jason Bergman in January and Avery Gibson in March 2019, he fought for his first professional title against Jonathan Rice on 17 May at the Montreal Casino. Makhmudov captured the vacant WBC Continental Americas heavyweight title via seventh-round TKO. He won his second regional championship, the WBC-NABF heavyweight title, via third-round TKO against Julian Fernandez on 28 September at the Montreal Casino. The first defence of his WBC-NABF title came against former world champion, Samuel Peter, on 7 December at the Bell Centre in Montreal. Makhmudov retained his title via first-round TKO. Makhmudov made his second title defense against Dillon Carman on 10 October 2020. He won the fight by a first-round technical knockout, stopping Carman after just 27 seconds.

On 23 July 2021, Mahmudov faced Pavel Sour in the second defense of his WBC-NABF title fight and in a fight for the vacant WBA-NABA heavyweight title. He won the fight by a first-round knockout, stopping Sour with a right straight after just 37 seconds. Makhmudov made the first defense of the two titles against Erkan Teper on 23 September 2021. He won the fight by a first-round stoppage, as Teper retired from the fight at the end of the round.

Makhmudov successfully defended his WBC-NABF and WBA-NABA titles against the one-time unified heavyweight title challenger Mariusz Wach on 19 February 2022. He won the fight by a sixth-round technical knockout. Makhmudov made another WBC-NABF and WBA-NABA heavyweight title defense against Carlos Takam on 16 September 2022. Aside from the aforementioned titles, the vacant WBC Silver heavyweight title was on the line as well. Makhmudov won the fight by unanimous decision.

Makhmudov was expected to make his seventh WBC-NABF title defense against the undefeated Raphael Akpejiori on 16 December 2022. Akpejiori withdrew from the bout on 16 November, as his team opted to pursue a different fight instead, and was replaced by Michael Wallisch. Makhmudov won the fight via 1st round TKO.

Professional boxing record

References

External links

Living people
1989 births
Russian male boxers
Heavyweight boxers
People from Mozdoksky District
Sportspeople from North Ossetia–Alania